Robert Bruce Simonds Jr. (born 1964) is an American film producer, entrepreneur, and the founder & chairman of STX Entertainment, which creates, produces, distributes, finances, and markets film (as STXfilms), television (as STXtelevision), digital media (as STXdigital), and live events as well as virtual reality (as STXsurreal). The company bridges the gap between China and the US, with additional partnerships around the globe (as STXinternational). According to The Wall Street Journal in its first four years, Simonds more than tripled the company's valuation to an estimated US$3.5 billion. In September 2017, it was reported that STX was close to an initial public offering on the Hong Kong Stock Exchange (SEHK), and in April 2018, the company announced it had filed for an IPO. In October 2018, it was announced that STX would not go through with the IPO, as market conditions had changed. Prior to working at STX, Simonds was an independent film producer whose over 30 films have generated more than $6 billion in worldwide box office revenue.

Early life and education
Simonds was born in Phoenix the son of Robert Bruce Simonds Sr., a businessman. He graduated from Yale University.

Producing
From 1990 to 2012, Simonds produced over 30 Hollywood studio films, including the Adam Sandler films Billy Madison, Happy Gilmore, The Wedding Singer, Big Daddy and The Waterboy; Cheaper by the Dozen, and The Pink Panther which stars Steve Martin. He also produced This Means War with Academy Award-winning actress Reese Witherspoon and Tom Hardy. Simonds has produced a number of highly-profitable cult films including Joe Dirt and Half Baked.

STX Entertainment

Formation
In 2012, Simonds and Bill McGlashan, founder and managing partner of private equity firm TPG Growth, began conceptualizing and building a film, television and multimedia company that would make, market and distribute star-driven, commercial content to be distributed worldwide. In 2014, STX Entertainment was formally launched with financing led by TPG Growth, and the company later secured investments from Chinese private equity firm Hony Capital and other individuals including Gigi Pritzker and William "Beau" Wrigley, Jr. II.

Serving as chairman and CEO of STX, Simonds hired entertainment industry veterans to build his executive team including former Viacom Entertainment Group COO Thomas B. McGrath and former CEO of Crest Animation Noah Fogelson.  Former Universal Pictures chairman Adam Fogelson and former Disney and Fox production and marketing chief Oren Aviv were also added to the team. Discovery Communications' former CFO Andrew Warren and former Paramount Pictures and Condé Nast communications head Patricia Röckenwagner later also joined.

The company has multiple divisions: film (STXfilms), which includes animation and family content; television (STXtelevision), which includes scripted and unscripted content; and digital media (STXdigital); along with an international partnership and distribution arm headquartered in London (STXinternational).

In 2016, the company received additional investment from Chinese Internet company Tencent and Hong Kong-based telecommunications company PCCW, and East West Bank's chairman and CEO Dominic Ng. In 2017, the world's largest international television and broadband company Liberty Global invested an undisclosed amount in the company. Funds from that round of financing will be used to continue to build STX Entertainment's TV division, further expand internationally and potentially make acquisitions. In March 2019, STX raised $700 million in new capital, in a round led by TPG Growth and Hony Capital, to help STX release more films, expand its TV business, and pursue acquisitions.

STX Entertainment's Board of Directors is composed of investors and industry veterans including: Simonds, David Bonderman (founding partner of TPG Capital), John Zhao (CEO of Hony Capital), Gigi Pritzker (founder of MWM Studios), Janice Lee (managing director of PCCW Media Group), Tracy Cui (managing director of Hony Capital), Frank Biondi (former president and CEO of Viacom and former chairman and CEO of Universal Studios; senior managing director of WaterView Advisors), Dominic Ng (chairman and CEO of East West Bank), Carmen Chang (chairman of New Enterprise Associates), and Bruce Mann (chief programming officer of Liberty Global).

STXfilms
When STX was launched the film division of the company focused its efforts on creating a new model. Rather than pursuing the traditional distribution process the company secured direct distribution agreements with North American theater chains AMC, Regal, Cinemark, Goodrich, Marcus Theatres, and Carmike Cinemas. In early 2015, the company signed a multi-year television output agreement to release films exclusively to Showtime Networks and its multiplex channels Showtime, TMC and Flix, covering STX theatrical releases through 2019. In April 2015, the company entered a multi-year partnership with Universal Studios Home Entertainment for Universal to handle marketing, sales and distribution services for Blu-ray, DVD and VOD platforms for STX theatrical titles in North America.  That same month, STXfilms closed a three-year slate deal with Huayi Brothers, one of China's largest film studios, enabling the companies to co-produce and co-distribute 12 to 15 films annually. In 2015, STXfilms acquired its first film at the Toronto International Film Festival, purchasing the worldwide rights to Hardcore Henry for $10 million USD. In January 2017, STXfilms signed a three-year marketing and distribution agreement with Luc Besson's EuropaCorp Films USA to release their upcoming slate of films.

STXfilms projects have included Bad Moms; Molly's Game; I Feel Pretty; and Gringo with Amazon Studios; The Gift, written, co-produced and directed by Joel Edgerton; The Edge of Seventeen; The Foreigner starring Jackie Chan; and Secret in Their Eyes starring Nicole Kidman and Julia Roberts; The Boy; and Free State of Jones starring Matthew McConaughey. STXfilms announced The Happytime Murders starring Melissa McCarthy and the film was released on August 24, 2018; an untitled romantic comedy developed by and starring Anne Hathaway; and Second Act, a romantic comedy starring Jennifer Lopez and directed by Peter Segal and was released on December 21, 2018.

STXtelevision
In 2014, the television division’s first project was the 13-episode series State of Affairs, starring Katherine Heigl and Alfre Woodard, which was sold to NBC. In 2015, STXtelevision produced the NBC pilot Problem Child, based on the 1990 film of the same name. In April 2016, the STXtelevision Chinese variety show Number One Surprise premiered on Hunan TV, and became the #1 show in China with over 1 billion total views. In May 2017, STXtelevision announced it had acquired the first TV project from Kevin Kwan, author of Crazy Rich Asians. In November 2017, STXtelevision announced Valley of the Boom, a docudrama about the 1990s tech boom from showrunner and director Matthew Carnahan and executive producer Arianna Huffington, set to air on NatGeo. STXtelevision produced season 23 of True Life, which aired on MTV in 2017. In February 2018, Fox and STXtelevision announced it is developing an unscripted series based on STXfilms' Bad Moms. In October 2018, STXtv received a pilot order from YouTube for The Edge of Seventeen, based on the film of the same name released by STXfilms in 2016.

STXdigital
In August 2016, STXdigital acquired virtual reality (VR) studio Surreal, renaming it STXsurreal. Founded in 2015, in its first year Surreal produced over 70 immersive VR experiences. In June 2017, STXsurreal announced a partnership with media services agency Horizon Media to develop and produce VR and immersive content for the brand's new UNCVR unit. In 2018, STXsurreal announced a slate of original projects including The Limit, a live-action, short-form series from Robert Rodriguez and starring Michelle Rodriguez; New Tricks, directed and produced by Ed Helms; and The Kiev Exchange, a spinoff of STXfilms' Mile 22. In December 2017, it was announced that STXdigital acquired the exclusive Chinese distribution rights to Dick Clark's New Year's Rockin' Eve from Dick Clark Productions (dcp), along with the Chinese distribution rights to the 2018 Golden Globes broadcast from dcp and the Hollywood Foreign Press Association. STXdigital and Tencent partnered to broadcast both shows on Tencent Video. In January 2018, the companies announced they would also co-produce a live Chinese-language Golden Globes red carpet pre-show, to air live with the telecast.

STXinternational
In April 2016, a dedicated international division (STXinternational) opened. Headquartered in London, the division is led by former Film4 head David Kosse. The division launched with a slate of six films that included Andy Serkis's directorial debut Breathe (which opened the 2017 London Film Festival), Home Again starring Reese Witherspoon, and Wind River starring Jeremy Renner and Elizabeth Olsen. Additional titles on the STXinternational slate include Ridley Scott's All the Money in the World, Morten Tyldum's The Marsh King's Daughter, and Bart Layton's American Animals; and titles from the main STXfilms slate. In March 2019, John Friedberg was named president of STXinternational.

Accolades
In 2014, Simonds was featured as one of Hollywood's top dealmakers in Variety magazine's Dealmakers Impact Report for his work at STX. The Hollywood Reporter has named Simonds one of the 100 Most Powerful People in Entertainment in each of their annual rankings through 2018, since first publishing them in 2016. In 2017, Variety featured Simonds on their first annual Variety500: Entertainment Leaders and Icons list. He made the list again in 2018.

Personal life
While attending Yale Simonds dated actress Jennifer Beals. Simonds married Anne Biondi in 1999, and the couple live in Los Angeles with their son and four daughters. About 2010 Simonds bought a house at Mulholland Estates for $4.7 million.

Filmography

As producer

As executive producer

Television

As executive producer

References

External links 
 
 Metropolitan Water District of Southern California Blue Ribbon Committee
  Nuverra Environmental Solutions Board of Directors
 Q&A With William McGlashan and Robert Simonds Worth August/September 2014
 National Academy of Sciences Water Sciences & Technology Board Members

Living people
Businesspeople from Phoenix, Arizona
Yale University alumni
STX Entertainment
American film studio executives
Film producers from Arizona
1964 births